J65 may refer to:
 Augmented truncated tetrahedron
 , a minesweeper of the Royal Navy
 LNER Class J65, a British steam locomotive class
 Wright J65, a turbojet engine